Salvatore Santoro (born 9 March 1999) is an Italian professional footballer who plays as a midfielder for  club Monterosi on loan from Pisa.

Club career
Born in Naples, Santoro started his career in Casertana, and was promoted to first team for the 2017–18 season. He played 101 matches for the club in four Serie C seasons.

On 6 July 2021, he signed with Pisa.

On 31 August 2021, he was loaned to Pistoiese.

At the middle of the season, on 31 January 2022, he joined on loan to Imolese. On 3 January 2023, Santoro was loaned by Monterosi.

References

External links
 
 

1999 births
Living people
Footballers from Naples
Italian footballers
Association football midfielders
Serie C players
Casertana F.C. players
Pisa S.C. players
U.S. Pistoiese 1921 players
Imolese Calcio 1919 players
Monterosi Tuscia F.C. players